Maria Angeli Tabaquero is a Filipino volleyball athlete. She was a member of the UAAP champion teams of the UST Golden Tigresses (2008-2010).

Career
Tabaquero was named team captain for the Philippine national team in 2013 in the Asian Championship. She was the captain of the Cagayan Valley Lady Rising Suns club that won the 2013 Shakey's V-League Open Conference over Smart-Maynilad Net Spikers in the finals.
 She played the 2014 Asian Club Championship with PLDT HOME TVolution in March

As team captain, Tabaquero played for Kia Forte in the 2015 Shakey's V-League 12th Season Reinforced Open Conference. Tabaquero participated in the 2016 PSL Invitational Cup with Foton Toplanders as team's Libero. Even when she thought it would be a temporary role, she played this position until the last match, when she suffered an injury, and her team could not reach the playoffs. She was appointed as assistant coach for the Adamson Lady Falcons in September 2016.

Clubs
  Cagayan Valley Lady Rising Suns (2013)
  PLDT HOME TVolution (2014)
  Kia Forte (2015)
  Foton Toplanders (2016)

References

Filipino women's volleyball players
People from San Jose del Monte
Sportspeople from Bulacan
1989 births
University Athletic Association of the Philippines volleyball players
Living people
Filipina gravure idols
University of Santo Tomas alumni
Wing spikers